Jadestadion is a multi-use stadium in Wilhelmshaven, Germany.  It is used mostly for football matches and is the home stadium of SV Wilhelmshaven. The capacity is 7,500 people.

References

Football venues in Germany
Buildings and structures in Wilhelmshaven
Sports venues in Lower Saxony